Butner is a populated place in Seminole County, Oklahoma at an elevation of 925 feet.  It is about 6 miles south of Cromwell, Oklahoma on Oklahoma State Highway 56.  It had a post office from June 1, 1903, to November 30, 1906.  It was named for one Thomas Butner, an early settler.

Butner Public Schools are actually located in Cromwell.  The district was created in its present form in 1961 as a consolidation of the Excelsior, Cromwell and Butner public school districts.

References

Unincorporated communities in Seminole County, Oklahoma
Unincorporated communities in Oklahoma